The Authenticity and Modernity Party is a political party in Morocco. It was founded in 2008 by Fouad Ali El Himma, an advisor to the king Mohammed VI, and it has been perceived by its opponents and the press as being backed and directed by the monarchy. As such, it has been accused of having little ideology except for support of the monarchy, although some of its policies have been described as socially liberal.

History

Establishment
The political party was founded in 2008. Its first constitutive congress took place on 20 February 2009. It was preceded by the Authenticity and Modernity parliamentary bloc, formed after the 2007 parliamentary election, and the think tank "Movement of All Democrats" (Mouvement de Tous les Démocrats, MTD), both created and led by El Himma. "The Movement of All Democrats" creation communiqué was signed by a number of influential Moroccan public figures including: Aziz Akhenouch, Mustapha Bakkoury, Ahmed Akhchichine, Rachid Talbi Alami, Mohamed Cheikh Biadillah and three human rights activists who had served on Mohammed VI's Equity and Reconciliation Commission which investigated human rights abuses during Hassan II's reign.

A number of political parties merged into PAM: Al Ahd, the National Democratic Party (PND), the Alliance of Liberties, the Environment and Development Party and the Civic Initiative for Development. The formation's main objective was to hit back at the rise of the Islamist Justice and Development Party (PJD). It has been characterised as reform-oriented and modernist, but lacks a clear political orientation. It positioned itself between the parties of the Istiqlal Party-led coalition and the oppositional PJD. Because of uncertainties about the organisation's ideology and political strategy, the PND and al-Ahd left it again a short time after they had joined.

As a royal party aimed at maintaining the dominant role of the monarch, it can be compared to the Front for the Defence of Constitutional Institutions (FDIC) of the 1960s, the National Rally of Independents (RNI) of the 1970s and the Constitutional Union (UC) of the 1980s. Despite being its factual leader, El Himma has not taken up a formal post in the party.

Controversy and alleged palace involvement
Although Fouad Ali El Himma, a close friend of Mohammed VI, was key in the foundation of the party and many observers—including the American ambassador in Morocco—have described the party as "the palace party", a Moroccan court sentenced politician Abdellah El Kadiri to a fine of 4 million Dirhams (US$500,000) after it judged that alleging that the Palace had a role in the foundation of the party amounts to slander. Abdellah El Kadiri was president of one of the political parties that merged itself into the Authenticity and Modernity Party.

Development since 2009
Mohamed Cheikh Biadillah was elected as the first secretary-general on 22 February 2009.

In the 2009 communal elections, the party won the greatest number of seats, replacing the Istiqlal Party as the leading force. Due to defections from other parties, the PAM became a major force in parliament. In October 2009, it took over the presidency of the House of Councillors.

On the eve of the 2011 parliamentary election the PAM formed an alliance with seven other political parties of very disparate political outlooks called the "Alliance for Democracy". The party won 47 out of 325 seats in the election, becoming the fourth-largest party in the parliament. After the victory of the Islamist PJD, the PAM announced it would go into opposition.

The PAM won 102 seats in the October 2016 parliamentary election, an increase of 55, making it the second largest party.

Electoral results

Moroccan Parliament

References

Further reading

2008 establishments in Morocco
Liberal parties in Morocco
Monarchist parties
Political parties in Morocco
Political parties established in 2008
Social liberal parties